Rudbari (Rudbāri) may be any of several Iranian dialects:

Rudbaraki or Kelardashti, a dialect (or closely related language) of Gilaki
Rudbari, variously classified as a dialect of Mazanderani or of Tati